Mike Townsend (born March 19, 1952) is a former American football defensive back who played one season in the World Football League with the Jacksonville Sharks and Memphis Southmen. He was drafted by the Minnesota Vikings in the fourth round of the 1974 NFL Draft. He played college football at the University of Notre Dame.  Townsend was a captain on the Notre Dame 1973 national championship team. He led the nation with ten interceptions as a junior. He was a Consensus All-American in 1973.

References

External links
Just Sports Stats

Living people
1952 births
Players of American football from Ohio
American football defensive backs
African-American players of American football
Notre Dame Fighting Irish football players
Memphis Southmen players
Jacksonville Sharks (WFL) players
All-American college football players
Sportspeople from Hamilton, Ohio
21st-century African-American people
20th-century African-American sportspeople